The 2023 Men's Indoor Hockey World Cup was the sixth edition of this tournament and played from 5 to 11 February 2023 in Pretoria, South Africa.

Austria won their second consecutive title by defeating the Netherlands in the final after penalty shootout, while Iran captured the bronze medal, winning against the United States.

Qualification
All the teams which qualified for the cancelled 2022 edition of the tournament were eligible to participate in the 2023 edition.

First round
The schedule was released on 17 October 2022.

All times are local (UTC+2).

Pool A

Pool B

Classification matches

Eleventh place game

Ninth place game

Second round

Bracket

Quarter-finals

Semi-finals

Third place game

Final

Final standings

Awards
The following awards were given at the conclusion of the tournament.

Goalscorers

See also
 2023 Men's FIH Hockey World Cup
 2023 Women's FIH Indoor Hockey World Cup

Notes

References

2023
FIH Indoor Hockey World Cup
Indoor Hockey world Cup Men
Indoor Hockey World Cup Men
International field hockey competitions hosted by South Africa
Sports competitions in Pretoria